The Piedmontese regional election of 2000 took place on 16 April 2000.

Enzo Ghigo (Forza Italia) was re-elected for the second time in a row President, defeating Livia Turco (Democrats of the Left). His re-election resulted in a landslide, as this time he was supported also by the Northern League.

Forza Italia was confirmed as the largest party in the region with an historic 30.8% of the vote, while the Democrats of the left were the second largest party with 17.7%. Piedmont was confirmed as a stronghold of Bonino List, whose leader Emma Bonino was candidate for president and took 5.7% of the vote.

Electoral system
Regional elections in Piedmont were ruled by the "Tatarella law" (approved in 1995), which provided for a mixed electoral system: four fifths of the regional councilors were elected in provincial constituencies by proportional representation, using the largest remainder method with a droop quota and open lists, while the residual votes and the unassigned seats were grouped into a "single regional constituency", where the whole ratios and the highest remainders were divided with the Hare method among the provincial party lists; one fifth of the council seats instead was reserved for regional lists and assigned with a majoritarian system: the leader of the regional list that scored the highest number of votes was elected to the presidency of the Region while the other candidates were elected regional councilors.

A threshold of 3% had been established for the provincial lists, which, however, could still have entered the regional council if the regional list to which they were connected had scored at least 5% of valid votes.

The panachage was also allowed: the voter can indicate a candidate for the presidency but prefer a provincial list connected to another candidate.

Parties and candidates

Results

References 

2000 elections in Italy
Elections in Piedmont